Benning may refer to:

People
 Benning Wentworth, governor of New Hampshire under kings George II and George III
 Benning (surname)

Places
 Benning, Minnesota, an unincorporated community
 Benning, Washington, D.C., a residential neighborhood in northeast Washington D.C.
 Benning Heights, Washington, D.C.
 Benning Ridge, Washington, D.C.
 Benning Road station, a Metro station in Washington
 Benning Race Track, a horse racing venue that opened in 1890 in Washington
 Benning National Forest, a National Forest in Georgia, United States
 Fort Benning, a U.S. Army post in Georgia
 Fort Benning South, a former census-designated place in Georgia, now part of the consolidated city of Cusseta

Other things

 Benning Violins, a firm in Studio City, California
 Norm Benning Racing, a stock-car team

See also
Bening (disambiguation)
Binning (disambiguation)